The Heliocentrics are an English, London-based musical collective that combines funk, jazz, psych, and library influences. The group is based around drummer and producer Malcolm Catto, bassist Jake Ferguson, guitarist Adrian Owusu, and multi-instrumentalist Jack Yglesias.

History 
The Heliocentrics released their debut album Out There in 2007 on Now-Again Records. This was followed by collaborations with Ethiopian musician Mulatu Astatke on the album Inspiration Information (2009), which was awarded that year’s Gilles Peterson Worldwide Winner Album of the Year award, Lloyd Miller & The Heliocentrics (OST) (2010), and Orlando Julius.

The Heliocentrics appeared on the track "Skullfuckery" on the UK release of the DJ Shadow album The Outsider, which was released in 2006.

In 2013, they released their second full album, 13 Degrees of Reality also on Stones Throw. The 2009 album with Astatke was included in a list of 'Five Essential Jazz Albums' chosen by pianist Jamie Cullum in 2013.

In 2017, they released A World of Masks with vocals by Barbora Patkova, as well as The Sunshine Makers OST, the score they wrote for the 2015 British documentary The Sunshine Makers, directed by Cosmo Feilding-Mellen. Both records were released on Soundway Records.

In 2020, they released Infinity of Now.

Discography
Adapted from Discogs.

Studio albums

EPs

Singles

Compilations

References

External links

English funk musical groups
Musical groups from London
Now-Again Records artists